Gavi (also Romanized as Gāvī) is a village in Kahnuk Rural District, Irandegan District, Khash County, Sistan and Baluchestan Province, Iran.

References 

Populated places in Khash County